Dawn of the Undead is an album by American punk band the Undead, originally released on vinyl in 1991 on the Australian label Shagpile Records. It was reissued on CD in 1997 and again in 2006 by Post Mortem Records.

Track listing (LP edition)
Evening of Desire
A Life of Our Own
Never Say Die
Gimme Your Autograph
I Don't Wanna Go
In Eighty Four
 The Way We Behave
Put Your Clothes Back On 
R.A.T.T.F.I.N.K.
I Want You Dead
We Don't Want the Poor in New York City
When the Evening Comes
Verbal Abuse (Remix)
My Kinda Town
Undead

Track listing (CD edition)
Evening of Desire  
A Life of Our Own 
Never Say Die 
Gimme Your Autograph 
I Don't Wanna Go 
In Eighty Four 
The Way We Behave 
Put Your Clothes Back On 
R.A.T.T.F.I.N.K.
I Want You Dead 
We Don't Want the Poor in New York City 
When the Evening Comes 
Verbal Abuse 
My Kinda Town 
Hollywood Boulevard 
Undead 
Social Reason 
No Vices 
Nightmare 
Lies 
Eve of Destruction
Misfit

References

Notes

1991 albums
The Undead albums